Nagi may refer to:

Places
Nagi, Okayama, a town in Japan
Nagi Station, a railway station
Nagi, Nepal (disambiguation), several places
 Nagi, Panchthar
Nagi, an island in the Torres Strait island group more commonly (but incorrectly) spelled Naghir

People
Nagi Hanatani, Japanese tennis player.
, Japanese footballer
Nagi Noda, a J-pop artist
Nagi Yanagi, a J-pop artist
B. Nagi Reddy, a Telugu movie producer

Fictional characters
Souichirō Nagi, from Tenjho Tenge
Nagi (Bloody Roar), from Bloody Roar
Nagi (Tenchi Universe), from Tenchi Universe
Nagi Homura, from My-HiME and My-Otome
Nagi Kirima, from Boogiepop series
Nagi Naoe, from Weiß Kreuz
Nagi Sanzen'in, from Hayate the Combat Butler
Nagi Springfield, from Negima!: Magister Negi Magi
Nagi, from Kannagi: Crazy Shrine Maidens
Izanagi (Nagi), from Ōkami
 Nagi, Chrome Dokuro's original name from Katekyo Hitman Reborn!
Nagi Matsuno, from Shuriken Sentai Ninninger
Rokuya Nagi, from IDOLiSH7
Mikado Nagi, member of HE★VENS, from Uta no Prince-sama
Seishirō Nagi, from Blue Lock

Other
Nāgī (or Nāginī), female serpent deities in Hinduism and Buddhism

Japanese unisex given names